Seven Days to the River Rhine (Sem' dney do reki Reyn) was a top-secret military simulation exercise developed in 1979 by the Warsaw Pact. It depicted the Soviet Bloc's vision of a seven-day nuclear war between NATO and Warsaw Pact forces.

Declassification
 
This possible World War III scenario was released by Polish Defense Minister Radosław Sikorski following the Law and Justice Party's victories in the 2005 Polish elections along with thousands of Warsaw Pact documents, in order to "draw a line under [the original Polish verb "odciąć" could also be translated as "make a break from"] the country's Communist past", and "educate the Polish public about the old regime." Sikorski stated that documents associated with the former regime would be declassified and published through the Institute of National Remembrance in the coming year.

The files released included documents about "Operation Danube", the 1968 Warsaw Pact invasion of Czechoslovakia in response to the Prague Spring. They also included files on the 1970 Polish protests, and from the martial law era of the 1980s.

The Czech Republic and Hungary had declassified related documents in the 1990s. The Polish government declassified some material in this period.

Battle outline

The scenario for the war was NATO launching a nuclear attack on Polish and Czechoslovak cities in the Vistula river valley area in a first-strike scenario, which would prevent Warsaw Pact commanders from sending reinforcements to East Germany to forestall a possible NATO invasion of that country. The plan expected that as many as two million Polish civilians would die in such a war and Polish operational strength would be completely destroyed.

A Soviet nuclear counter-strike would be launched against West Germany, Belgium, the Netherlands, Denmark and North-East Italy.

Nuclear response

Maps associated with the released plan show nuclear strikes in many NATO states, but exclude both France and the United Kingdom. There are several possibilities for this lack of strikes, the most probable being that both France and the United Kingdom are nuclear weapons states, and as such retain nuclear arsenals that could be employed in retaliation for nuclear strikes against their nations.

The French Force de dissuasion employed a nuclear strategy known as dissuasion du faible au fort (weak-to-strong deterrence); this is considered a "counter-value" strategy, which implies that a nuclear attack on France would be responded to by a strike on Soviet-bloc cities.

The Guardian, however, speculates that "France would have escaped attack, possibly because it is not a member of NATO's integrated structure. Britain, which has always been at the heart of NATO, would also have been spared, suggesting Moscow wanted to stop at the Rhine to avoid overstretching its forces."

In 1966, President Charles de Gaulle withdrew France from NATO's integrated military command structure. In practical terms, while France remained a NATO member and fully participated in the political instances of the Organization, it was no longer represented on certain committees like the Nuclear Planning Group and the Defence Planning Committee. Foreign forces were removed from French territory and French forces temporarily withdrawn from NATO commands. The 1st French Army, with its headquarters at Strasbourg, on the Franco-German border, was the main field headquarters controlling operations in support of NATO in West Germany, as well as defending France. Although France was not officially part of NATO's command structure, there was an understanding, formalised by regular joint exercises in West Germany, that France would go to the aid of NATO, should the Warsaw Pact attack. To that end, the Headquarters and two divisions of II (Fr) Corps were permanently stationed in West Germany, with the wartime mission of supporting NATO's US-led Central Army Group (CENTAG).

There are many high-value targets in Britain (like RAF Fylingdales, RAF Mildenhall, and RAF Lakenheath) that would then have to be struck in a conventional manner in this plan, though a nuclear strike would be far more effective (and, as the plans show, a preferable option for the Soviet leadership as shown by their strikes in Western Europe). The plan also indicates that USAF fighter-bombers, primarily the long-ranged F-111 Aardvark, would be employed in nuclear strikes, and that they would launch from those British bases.

The Soviets planned to use about 7.5 megatons of atomic weaponry in all during such a conflict.

Known targets
The Austrian capital Vienna was to be hit by two 500-kiloton bombs. In Italy, Vicenza, Verona, Padua, and several military bases were to be hit by single 500-kiloton bombs. Hungary was to capture Vienna.

Stuttgart, Munich, and Nuremberg in West Germany were to be destroyed by nuclear weapons and then captured by the Czechoslovaks and Hungarians.

In Denmark, the first nuclear targets were Roskilde and Esbjerg. Roskilde, while having no military significance, is the second-largest city on Zealand and located close to the Danish capital Copenhagen (the distance from central Copenhagen to Roskilde is only ). It would also be targeted for its cultural and historical significance to break the morale of the Danish population and army. Esbjerg, the fifth-largest city in the country, would be targeted for its large harbour capable of facilitating delivery of large NATO reinforcements. If there was Danish resistance after the two initial strikes, other targets would be bombed.

Additional plans
The Soviet Union planned to have reached Lyon by day nine and to press on to a final position at the Pyrenees. Czechoslovakia thought it to be too optimistic at the time, and some present-day Western planners believe that such a goal was unrealistic or even unattainable.

See also
 Operation Unthinkable
 Fulda Gap
 Square Leg (UK operation)
 World War III
 National Redoubt (Switzerland)
 Foundations of Geopolitics

References

General
"World War Three seen through Soviet eyes", David Rennie, Daily Telegraph, November 26, 2005. Retrieved May 19, 2006
"Poland Opens Secret Warsaw Pact Files ", Radio Free Europe, 2005, Retrieved March 16, 2009
"Soviet Nuclear Weapons in Hungary 1961-1991"

1979 in military history
Classified documents
Military exercises and wargames
Czechoslovakia–Soviet Union relations
Hungary–Soviet Union relations
Poland–Soviet Union relations
Soviet Union–United States relations
Soviet military exercises
Military operations involving the Warsaw Pact
Military plans